Receptor-type tyrosine-protein phosphatase H is an enzyme that in humans is encoded by the PTPRH gene.

The protein encoded by this gene is a member of the protein tyrosine phosphatase (PTP) family. PTPs are known to be signaling molecules that regulate a variety of cellular processes including cell growth, differentiation, mitotic cycle, and oncogenic transformation. This PTP possesses an extracellular region, a single transmembrane region, and a single intracytoplasmic catalytic domain, and thus represents a receptor-type PTP. The extracellular region contains eight fibronectin type III-like repeats and multiple N-glycosylation sites. The gene was shown to be expressed primarily in brain and liver, and at a lower level in heart and stomach. It was also found to be expressed in several cancer cell lines, but not in the corresponding normal tissues.

References

Further reading